"Foolish" is a song by British singer–songwriter Tyler James.  The song was originally given to Gareth Gates for his 2003 album Go Your Own Way. Tyler's version was released as the second single from his debut album studio album The Unlikely Lad (2005) in the United Kingdom on 7 March 2005. The song peaked to number 16 on the UK Singles Chart, his first Top 20 single in the UK.

Track listings
 Digital download
 "Foolish" - 3:55
 "Nothing" (Acoustic) - 3:26
 "Foolish (With My Hands Held High)" ["Re-Dub" Remix] - 4:09

Chart performance

Release history

References

2005 singles
Tyler James (English musician) songs
2004 songs
Songs written by Blair MacKichan
Island Records singles